The Italian ambassador in Bangkok is the official representative of the Government in Rome to the Government of Thailand. 

Since 1870 the governments in Rome and Bangkok maintain diplomatic relations.

List of representatives 
<onlyinclude>

References 

 
Thailand
Italy